The Liberal Progressive Party is a classical-liberal political party in Costa Rica.

It was founded on February 27, 2016, and participated in the 2018 parliamentary election for deputies in the provinces of San José, Alajuela, Heredia and Puntarenas, without obtaining seats in the Legislative Assembly. The PLP is chaired by the former Transport Vice-minister during the Rodríguez Echeverría administration, Eliécer Feinzaig. As a liberal party (both economically and culturally), it is in favor of a capitalist and free market economy, legalization of marijuana, in vitro fertilization and same-sex marriage.

The fundamental principles of the party are: 
 The dignity and autonomy of the individual. 
 The market economy.
 A small and efficient state. 
 A tolerant society, free of discrimination and privileges created by law. 
 Separation between religion and state. 
 Respect for private property and the rule of law.

Electoral performance

Presidential

Parliamentary

See also
 Liberalism in Costa Rica

References

External links
 Facebook
 TSE
 Sitio Official site

Liberal parties in Costa Rica
Political parties in Costa Rica
Classical liberal parties
Political parties established in 2016